Marcus Anthony Georges-Hunt (born March 28, 1994) is an American-U.S. Virgin Islander professional basketball player for Kuwait SC. He played college basketball for Georgia Tech.

High school career
Georges-Hunt attended North Clayton High School under coach Martisse Troup. As a senior, he averaged 24.2 points, 14.3 rebounds and 5.2 assists helping the Eagles to a 21–11 record and a berth in the state semifinals. When he graduated, he was North Clayton's all-time leading scorer with 2,189 points and was considered a 4-star recruit, being ranked No. 59 overall in the ESPN100, and No. 14 among small forwards.

College career
After graduating high school, Georges-Hunt played college basketball for Georgia Tech. He was a starter for the Yellow Jackets all four years, but injured his foot as a junior and missed some time. During his senior season, he led the team to the 2016 National Invitation Tournament after a 12–19 record the year prior. He averaged 16.9 points per game as a senior. Georges-Hunt was named to the Third Team All-Atlantic Coast Conference.

Professional career

Maine Red Claws (2016–2017)
After going undrafted in the 2016 NBA draft, Georges-Hunt joined the Brooklyn Nets for the 2016 NBA Summer League. In four games for the Nets, he averaged 2.8 points and 1.0 rebounds in 13.2 minutes per game. On September 26, 2016, he signed with the Boston Celtics. However, he was later waived by the Celtics on October 20, 2016 after appearing in two preseason games. On October 31, 2016, he was acquired by the Maine Red Claws of the NBA Development League as an affiliate player of the Celtics.

Miami Heat (2017)
On February 8, 2017, Georges-Hunt signed a 10-day contract with the Miami Heat to help the team deal with numerous injuries. Miami had to use an NBA hardship exemption in order to sign him as he made their roster stand at 16, being one player over the allowed limited of 15. On February 16, he was assigned to the Sioux Falls Skyforce so he could participate in the NBA Development League All-Star Game. On February 18, after the 10-day contract expired, he was reacquired by the Maine Red Claws.

Orlando Magic (2017)
On April 3, 2017, Georges-Hunt signed with the Orlando Magic. Following the 2016–17 season, he joined the Magic for the 2017 NBA Summer League, before being waived by the team on July 31, 2017.

Minnesota Timberwolves (2017–2018)
On August 11, 2017, Georges-Hunt signed with the Minnesota Timberwolves. On November 9, 2017, he was assigned to the Iowa Wolves of the NBA G League. He was recalled by the Timberwolves the next day. On January 20, 2018, he had career highs in points (12) and minutes (29) in the Timberwolves' 115–109 win over the Toronto Raptors. He played a total of 42 games for Minnesota

Return to Maine (2018)
On October 1, 2018, Georges-Hunt signed with the Boston Celtics to a training camp deal.
He was waived by Boston on October 13, 2018.
 He was signed by the Celtics' G League affiliate, the Maine Red Claws. Georges-Hunt was waived after suffering a season-ending injury on December 9, 2018.

College Park Skyhawks (2022)
On January 14, 2022, Georges-Hunt signed an NBA G League contract and was then acquired off-waivers by the College Park Skyhawks where he averaged 13.4 points, 5.3 rebounds and 3 assists in 28 games.

Brujos de Guayama (2022–present)
On May 17, 2022, Georges-Hunt signed with Brujos de Guayama of the Baloncesto Superior Nacional (BSN).

Georges-Hunt joined the Atlanta Hawks for the 2022 NBA Summer League.

Kuwait (2022) 
In October 2022, he played with Kuwait in the 2022 Arab Club Basketball Championship. Georges-Hunt helped Kuwait SC win their first-ever Arab championship.

NBA career statistics

Regular season

|-
| style="text-align:left;"| 
| style="text-align:left;"| Orlando
| 5 || 0 || 9.6 || .286 || .500 || .900 || 1.8 || 0.6 || 0.2 || 0.0 || 2.8
|- 
| style="text-align:left;"| 
| style="text-align:left;"| Minnesota
| 42 || 0 || 5.3 || .438 || .267 || .619 || 0.4 || 0.2 || 0.1 || 0.0 || 1.4
|- 
| style="text-align:center;" colspan="2"| Career
| 47 || 0 || 5.8 || .418 || .294 || .710 || 0.5 || 0.2 || 0.1 || 0.0 || 1.6

Playoffs 

|-
| style="text-align:left;"| 2018
| style="text-align:left;"| Minnesota
| 2 || 0 || 1.5 || .000 || – || – || .5 || .0 || .0 || .0 || .0
|- class="sortbottom"
| style="text-align:center;" colspan="2"| Career
| 2 || 0 || 1.5 || .000 || – || – || .5 || .0 || .0 || .0 || .0

Personal life
He has three siblings and three children.

References

External links
Georgia Tech Yellow Jackets bio

1994 births
Living people
21st-century African-American sportspeople
African-American basketball players
American men's basketball players
Basketball players from Georgia (U.S. state)
College Park Skyhawks players
Georgia Tech Yellow Jackets men's basketball players
Iowa Wolves players
Maine Red Claws players
Minnesota Timberwolves players
Orlando Magic players
Shooting guards
Sportspeople from College Park, Georgia
Undrafted National Basketball Association players
Kuwait SC basketball players